The 1975 Delaware State Hornets football team represented Delaware State College—now known as Delaware State University—as a member of the Mid-Eastern Athletic Conference (MEAC) in the 1975 NCAA Division II football season. Led by first-year head coach Ed Wyche, the Hornets compiled an overall record of 5–5 and a mark of 2–4 in conference play, placing fifth out of seven teams in the MEAC.

Schedule

Notes

References

Delaware State
Delaware State Hornets football seasons
Delaware State Hornets football